Parra  (Hebrew: גפן)  is a Spanish, Portuguese, and also Jewish surname, meaning grapevine or trellis, for example, a pergola. It is taken from the word meaning latticework and the vines raised on it. In Hebrew context the surname is used for Jewish people whose ancestors were wine makers as "Parra" (גפן "Geffen") is the Hebrew word in Spanish for vitis.

Etymology and history 
Among Sephardi Jews, the surname is a toponymic from the town of La Parra, Badajoz in Spain, where there was a large Jewish community before their expulsion from the Crowns of Castile and Aragon by the Alhambra Decree in 1492. Many descendants with the surname, some of them converso, went into exile in Portugal and the Netherlands, especially in Amsterdam. In Spain, numerous conversions took place, which is why the surname appears on the lists of the Catholic Church and the Inquisition. It is believed that the origin of the surname lies in the symbolism of the vine and the grapevine, which for the Jewish people means the People of Israel that grows and multiplies. Thus the fields of vines were called "fields of roses" because Israel was the "mystical rose".

At the beginning of the 19th century in the city of Buda, in Hungary, more than half a thousand Sephardic Jews were listed with the surname Parra.

People with the surname
 Ana Milagros Parra, Venezuelan political scientist
 Ángel Parra (judoka) (born 1983), Spanish judoka
 Beatriz Parra Durango (born 1940), Ecuadorian classical soprano
 Carlos Parra (born 1968), Bolivian drag queen
 Carolina Parra (born 1978), Brazilian musician
 Derek Parra (born 1970), U.S. Olympic gold medalist speed skater
 Dori Parra de Orellana (1923-2007), Venezuelan politician
 Fabio Parra (born 1959), Colombian road cyclist
 Facundo Parra (born 1985), Argentine footballer
 Francisco Parra Capó (1871 – c. 1945), mayor of Ponce, Puerto Rico, from 1921 to 1923
 Francisco Parra Duperón (1827–1899), Puerto Rican lawyer and banker
 Gabriel Parra (1947–1988), Chilean drummer of the folk group Los Jaivas, not related to the Parra family (see below)
 Gerardo Parra (born 1987), Venezuelan professional baseball player 
 Ibán Parra (born 1977), Spanish footballer
 Joaquín Parra (born 1961), Spanish footballer
 John Parra (born 1974), Colombian road cyclist
 José Parra (baseball) (born 1972), Dominican baseball player
 José Parra Martínez (1925–2016), Spanish footballer 
 Juanita Parra (born 1970), Chilean drummer of the folk group Los Jaivas, daughter of Gabriel Parra
 Lorenzo Parra (born 1978), Venezuelan flyweight boxer
 Manny Parra (born 1982), Mexican-American baseball player
 Marco Parra (born 1985), Mexican footballer
 Marco Parra Sánchez (born 1969), Peruvian politician
 Morgan Parra (born 1988), French rugby union player of Portuguese origin
 Sofanor Parra (born 1850), Chilean military 
 Parra family, Chilean family known for its many artists
 Violeta Parra (1917–1967), Chilean folk singer
 Nicanor Parra (1914–2018), Chilean mathematician and poet, brother of Violeta
 Roberto Parra Sandoval (1921–1995), Chilean folk singer, brother of Violeta
 Ángel Parra (1943–2017), Chilean folk singer, son of Violeta
 Isabel Parra (born 1939), Chilean folk singer, daughter of Violeta
 Catalina Parra (born 1940), Chilean artist, daughter of Nicanor
 Colombina Parra (born 1970), Chilean rock musician and singer, daughter of Nicanor
 Javiera Parra (born 1968), Chilean rock musician and singer, granddaughter of Violeta

De la Parra
 Adolfo de la Parra (born 1946), Mexican drummer, a member of Canned Heat
 Alondra de la Parra (born 1980), Mexican conductor, sister of Mane de la Parra
 Emoé de la Parra (born 1955), Mexican actress and academic, aunt of Alondra and Mane de la Parra
 John de la Parra (born 1980), American scholar 
 Mane de la Parra (born 1982), Mexican singer and actor, brother of Alondra de la Parra
 Marco Antonio de la Parra (born 1952), Chilean psychiatrist, writer, and dramatist
 Pim de la Parra (born 1940), Surinamese-Dutch film director
 Teresa de la Parra (1889–1936), Venezuelan novelist

References

Portuguese-language surnames
Spanish-language surnames
Jewish surnames
Sephardi Jewish culture in Europe
Sephardic surnames